Messier 14 (also known as M14 or NGC 6402) is a globular cluster of stars in the constellation Ophiuchus. It was discovered by Charles Messier in 1764.

At a distance of about 30,000 light-years, M14 contains several hundred thousand stars. At an apparent magnitude of +7.6 it can be easily observed with binoculars. Medium-sized telescopes will show some hint of the individual stars of which the brightest is of magnitude +14.

The total luminosity of M14 is in the order of 400,000 times that of the Sun corresponding to an absolute magnitude of -9.12. The shape of the cluster is decidedly elongated. M14 is about 100 light-years across.

A total of 70 variable stars are known in M14, many of the W Virginis variety common in globular clusters. In 1938, a nova appeared, although this was not discovered until photographic plates from that time were studied in 1964. It is estimated that the nova reached a maximum brightness of magnitude +9.2, over five times brighter than the brightest 'normal' star in the cluster.

Slightly over 3° southwest of M14 lies the faint globular cluster NGC 6366.

Gallery

See also
 List of Messier objects

References

External links

 SEDS Messier pages on M14
 M14, Galactic Globular Clusters Database page
  - one of the two being M14
 

Messier 014
Messier 014
014
Messier 014
17640601